William John "Boy" Murphy (4 September 1903 – 25 November 1979) was an Irish boxer who competed in the 1924 Summer Olympics and the 1928 Summer Olympics.

At the 1924 Summer Olympics he was eliminated in the quarter-finals of the middleweight class after losing his fight to Leslie Black. Four years later at the 1928 Summer Olympics he was eliminated in the quarter-finals of the light heavyweight class after losing his fight to the upcoming silver medalist Ernst Pistulla.

Murphy won the Amateur Boxing Association of England 1930 light heavyweight title.

References

External links
profile

1903 births
Year of death missing
Sportspeople from Cork (city)
Middleweight boxers
Light-heavyweight boxers
Olympic boxers of Ireland
Boxers at the 1924 Summer Olympics
Boxers at the 1928 Summer Olympics
Irish male boxers